Joshua Regnall Stewart (born February 6, 1977) is an American actor who is best known for his role as Holt McLaren in the FX TV series Dirt and as Detective William LaMontagne, Jr., on the CBS series Criminal Minds. He was also cast as Brendan Finney in the final season of the NBC TV series Third Watch and as Barsad in Christopher Nolan's The Dark Knight Rises. Other roles include War Machine and a major antagonist in Netflix's The Punisher (2019).

Early life
Stewart was born in  Diana, West Virginia, the son of Margie and Charles Regnall Stewart. His father was a high school physical education teacher as well as a former pastor of the First Baptist Church in Webster Springs and Holly River Baptist Church, and is now pastor at the Redeeming Grace Baptist Church in Webster Springs. His mother is a sixth grade teacher at Webster Springs Elementary. Stewart first attended West Virginia Wesleyan College, then transferred to West Virginia University, where he studied business. After graduating from WVU, he moved to New York City to pursue acting.

Acting career

Early career
Stewart got his start doing local theater at the Landmark Theatre in Sutton, West Virginia, and eventually moved to New York City to study at the T. Schreiber studios. He was a company member of the 13th Street Repertory Theatre. He continued his theater in Los Angeles, performing in Light Bulb and Beacon alongside Robert Forster and Brooke Shields.

Stewart appeared as an extra in The WB series Dawson's Creek episode "To Green, With Love". In 2003 he filmed a pilot for a Western for ABC entitled Then Came Jones. In the pilot he played the character of Bill Jenkins.

Stewart later appeared as Sean Cleary the CSI episode "Bad to the Bone", which aired on April 1, 2004. That same year, he also appeared in a commercial for Levi's 501 Original jeans. Stewart also had a recurring role in Criminal Minds as Detective William LaMontagne, Jr., SSA Jennifer "JJ" Jareau's boyfriend and later, husband.

Starring television roles
Stewart got his break when he was cast as Brendan Finney in the final season of the NBC series Third Watch. As Finney, he played the son of IAB captain Cathal "CT" Finney.

After Third Watch was cancelled, Stewart started filming a movie entitled Lenexa, 1 Mile (released on DVD as Full Count), alongside William Baldwin, Michael Beach, Jennifer Hall, Timothy Ryan Hensel, Chris Klein, Austin Nichols, Jason Ritter, Michael Rooker, and Paul Wesley. This was also the directing debut of Jason Wiles. After filming wrapped, Stewart began filming a new television series starring Courteney Cox Arquette entitled Dirt, for the FX Network, where he played the character of Holt McLaren. On June 8, 2008, Cox Arquette announced that Dirt had been cancelled. During the 2010–2011 season, he appeared as Joshua in ABC's No Ordinary Family. 

In 2017, Stewart starred as Solotov on the second season of the USA Network thriller drama Shooter.

On February 26, 2018, it was announced that Stewart would join as a series regular in the second season of Netflix's The Punisher. Stewart joined alongside cast member Alexa Davalos, who is Stewart's wife in real life.

Feature films
Stewart made his mainstream feature film debut in 2008's Curious Case of Benjamin Button playing the character of Benjamin's crewmate, Pleasant Curtis. Also that year, he appeared in The Haunting of Molly Hartley in the role of Mary Hartley's teacher, Mr. Draper. In 2009, he had his first feature film starring role, in the horror movie The Collector, playing the part of Arkin, a man attempting to rob a house to make enough money to pay off his wife's debts to loan sharks. In 2010, he starred, alongside Jamie-Lynn Sigler in the movie Beneath the Dark, (originally titled Wake) inspired by the novel The Shining. He appeared in Christopher Nolan's  final film in his Batman Saga, The Dark Knight Rises as Bane's right-hand man, Barsad. He appeared as the main protagonist in the 2012 webisodes, The Walking Dead: Cold Storage, which are based on the popular television show The Walking Dead. In 2013, Josh finished filming his directorial debut, The Hunted, in which he also stars. Stewart reunited in 2014 with director Christopher Nolan as the voice of CASE in the sci-fi epic Interstellar. The same year Stewart was cast in the Disney film The Finest Hours.

Directorial debut
Stewart's directorial and writing debut was the 2013 film The Hunted. He co-produced the film along with The Collector producers Brett Forbes and Patrick Rizzotti. The found footage film revolves around Jake (Stewart) and Stevie (Ronnie Gene Blevins) who want their own TV show. In an attempt to grab the media's attention, both Jake and Stevie head to the dense, secluded woods in West Virginia, armed with only their bows and a camera, to find the biggest guy they can. However, as the sun sets over the mountains, they soon realise they are not alone in the woods and something supernatural is hunting them instead. The film screened at TIFF and eOne Films have since picked up the North American distribution rights.

Personal life
In 2007, Stewart married Deanna Brigidi. They have two children: daughter Ryan Justine (born 2008) and son River Jacob (born 2010). They separated in 2014 and divorced in 2016.

On February 27, 2012, Stewart went into cardiac arrest after contracting salmonella. His wife performed CPR for several minutes. Stewart now has an implantable cardioverter-defibrillator in his chest.

Stewart married actress Alexa Davalos on May 19, 2019. They starred together on the second season of the Netflix series The Punisher.

Filmography

References

External links

 
 Josh Stewart at TVGuide.com

1977 births
Living people
Male actors from West Virginia
American male film actors
American male television actors
People from Webster County, West Virginia
West Virginia University alumni
21st-century American male actors
American male voice actors
20th-century American male actors